Atif Ali (born 26 June 1984) is a Pakistani cricketer who has played in more than 50 first-class matches between 2001 and 2017.

References

External links
 

1984 births
Living people
Pakistani cricketers
Port Qasim Authority cricketers
Karachi Port Trust cricketers
Cricketers from Karachi